Sir William Grenfell Max Muller  (9 June 1867 – 10 May 1945) was a British diplomat. He was British Minister to Poland from 1920 to 1928.

The son of the German-born philologist and Orientalist, Max Müller, Wilhelm (later changed to William) Grenfell Max Muller was educated at Eton College and University College, Oxford.

Further reading

 The Life and Letters of the Right Honourable Friedrich Max Müller, 1902 (Archive)

Notes

References 

 https://www.ukwhoswho.com/view/10.1093/ww/9780199540891.001.0001/ww-9780199540884-e-228977

1867 births
1945 deaths
Members of HM Diplomatic Service
People educated at Eton College
Alumni of University College, Oxford
Knights Grand Cross of the Order of the British Empire
Knights Commander of the Order of St Michael and St George
Companions of the Order of the Bath
Members of the Royal Victorian Order
British people of German descent
20th-century British diplomats